Quentin Martin Jakoba (born 19 December 1987) is a Curaçaoan former professional footballer who played on a professional level for Eerste Divisie league club FC Eindhoven during the 2008–2009 season. He later mainly played for Kozakken Boys in the Dutch Tweede Divisie.

International career
Jakoba was called up to the Curaçao national football team for March 2017.

References

External links
voetbal international profile
Soccerway Profile
NFT Profile

1987 births
Living people
Footballers from Tilburg
Curaçao footballers
Curaçao international footballers
Dutch footballers
FC Eindhoven players
Kozakken Boys players
Eerste Divisie players
Tweede Divisie players
Dutch people of Curaçao descent
Dutch sportspeople of Ghanaian descent
ASWH players
2017 CONCACAF Gold Cup players
Association football defenders